Delle is a commune in the Territoire de Belfort department in Bourgogne-Franche-Comté in northeastern France.

Delle is the last French town on the railway line from Belfort to Berne, in Switzerland. The railway station in Delle is served by trains to Belfort and Biel/Bienne.

Population

See also

Communes of the Territoire de Belfort department

References

External links
Official website 
Train and bus connections from Paris to Delle and on to Berne
Optymo, timetables for public transport in Territoire de Belfort

Communes of the Territoire de Belfort